Okiato or Old Russell is a small town in the Bay of Islands, New Zealand,  south of present-day Russell. It was founded in 1840 and served as New Zealand's first national capital until 1841, when the seat of government was moved to Auckland. The car ferry across the Bay of Islands, which provides the main access to Russell, runs between Okiato and Opua.

Etymology
The name Okiato comes from Māori.
 
The New Zealand Ministry for Culture and Heritage translates Ōkiato to "place of [a] receptacle for holding sacred objects" .

History

Pomare, the local Māori chief in the 1830s, sold land at Okiato to a British merchant and ship owner, Captain James Reddy Clendon, who settled there in 1832 and set up a trading station with partner Samuel Stephenson. Clendon became the first United States Consul for New Zealand in 1838 or 1839.

When the Treaty of Waitangi was signed in February 1840, Lieutenant-Governor William Hobson instructed the Surveyor-General, Felton Mathew, to report on possible locations for a capital in the Bay of Islands. Clendon's property met the requirements for a good anchorage and immediate availability of land suitable for subdivision and on-sale to settlers. Kororāreka (present-day Russell) was discounted as it had insufficient available land, and locations such as Paihia and Kerikeri were bypassed for various reasons. Clendon wanted 23,000 pounds for the 1.24 km² of land, the house, two small cottages, a large store and other buildings. Hobson eventually secured it for 15,000 pounds. He changed its name from Okiato to Russell, in honour of the Secretary of State for the Colonies, Lord John Russell. Hobson and his family moved there in May 1840 and officials, troops, workmen and immigrants took up residence in permanent or temporary buildings and tents. Mathew drew up ambitious plans for a town, but only one of the intended roads was ever built – leading directly from the town hall to the town jail. A year later in 1841 New Zealand was established as a separate colony from New South Wales and Hobson moved the capital to Auckland and most of the Russell residents moved there too. A few officials lived on in the Government House at Russell but when it and the offices burned down in May 1842, they moved to Kororāreka leaving Russell virtually deserted.

Kororāreka was part of the Port of Russell and gradually became known as Russell also. In January 1844 Governor Robert FitzRoy officially designated Kororāreka as part of the township of Russell. Now the name Russell applies only to the erstwhile Kororāreka while Okiato has resumed its original name.

Demographics
Statistics New Zealand describes Ōkiato as a rural settlement. The settlement is part of the larger Russell Peninsula statistical area.

Ōkiato had a population of 183 at the 2018 New Zealand census, an increase of 15 people (8.9%) since the 2013 census, and an increase of 33 people (22.0%) since the 2006 census. There were 84 households, comprising 93 males and 90 females, giving a sex ratio of 1.03 males per female. The median age was 59.8 years (compared with 37.4 years nationally), with 15 people (8.2%) aged under 15 years, 18 (9.8%) aged 15 to 29, 84 (45.9%) aged 30 to 64, and 66 (36.1%) aged 65 or older.

Ethnicities were 91.8% European/Pākehā, 16.4% Māori, 3.3% Asian, and 1.6% other ethnicities. Percentages may add up to more than 100% as people may identify with more than one ethnicity.

Although some people chose not to answer the census's question about religious affiliation, 59.0% had no religion, 31.1% were Christian, 1.6% were Hindu, 1.6% were Buddhist and 3.3% had other religions.

Of those at least 15 years old, 36 (21.4%) people had a bachelor's or higher degree, and 30 (17.9%) people had no formal qualifications. The median income was $22,800, compared with $31,800 nationally. 9 people (5.4%) earned over $70,000 compared to 17.2% nationally. The employment status of those at least 15 was that 63 (37.5%) people were employed full-time, 24 (14.3%) were part-time, and 6 (3.6%) were unemployed.

Russell Peninsula statistical area

Russell Peninsula had a population of 606 at the 2018 New Zealand census, an increase of 81 people (15.4%) since the 2013 census, and an increase of 114 people (23.2%) since the 2006 census. There were 267 households, comprising 315 males and 291 females, giving a sex ratio of 1.08 males per female. The median age was 58.7 years (compared with 37.4 years nationally), with 60 people (9.9%) aged under 15 years, 51 (8.4%) aged 15 to 29, 285 (47.0%) aged 30 to 64, and 210 (34.7%) aged 65 or older.

Ethnicities were 90.6% European/Pākehā, 12.9% Māori, 3.5% Asian, and 2.5% other ethnicities. People may identify with more than one ethnicity.

The percentage of people born overseas was 33.7, compared with 27.1% nationally.

Although some people chose not to answer the census's question about religious affiliation, 58.4% had no religion, 28.2% were Christian, 2.0% had Māori religious beliefs, 0.5% were Hindu, 0.5% were Muslim and 1.5% had other religions.

Of those at least 15 years old, 126 (23.1%) people had a bachelor's or higher degree, and 93 (17.0%) people had no formal qualifications. The median income was $25,600, compared with $31,800 nationally. 60 people (11.0%) earned over $70,000 compared to 17.2% nationally. The employment status of those at least 15 was that 201 (36.8%) people were employed full-time, 81 (14.8%) were part-time, and 15 (2.7%) were unemployed.

References

Footnotes

Bibliography
 Lee, Jack (1998). Old Russell: New Zealand's First Capital. Northland Historical Publications Society, Inc. 

Former national capitals of New Zealand
Far North District
Populated places in the Northland Region
Bay of Islands
Former colonial capitals